Super Critical is the third studio album by English indie pop duo The Ting Tings, released on 24 October 2014 by Finca Records. "Wrong Club" was released as the lead single from the album on 15 August 2014, followed by "Do It Again" on 22 September 2014.

Background and recording
Super Critical was recorded in Ibiza and co-produced by former Duran Duran guitarist Andy Taylor. The duo rented a rural estate in the village of Santa Gertrudis, where they started writing and recording, before moving to Sonic Vista Studios with Taylor. The album was mixed at Avatar Studios in New York City. The album was influenced by Madonna, The Beatles, Diana Ross, Prince, Fleetwood Mac, Talking Heads, Nile Rodgers and Blondie.

Critical reception

Super Critical received mixed reviews from music critics. At Metacritic, which assigns a weighted mean rating out of 100 to reviews from mainstream critics, the album received an average score of 59, based on five reviews, which indicates "mixed or average reviews". Tim McNamara of The Australian called album "assured, confident and cohesive" and praised it as a "fantastic, upbeat and dance-inducing fare, signalling the resurgence of an act that has bet everything on doing their third album their way, and are set to reap the rewards." Fred Thomas of AllMusic wrote, "Though not quite as boisterous and immediate as their debut and nowhere as stylistically restless as Sounds from Nowheresville, the songs here slowly sink in and last a lot longer than anything else the band has done prior", yet concluded that "the maturation on Super Critical takes them out of the 'overbearing pop flash in the pan' category and suggests they may have even more interesting statements ahead of them."

Ed Potton of The Times found Super Critical to be "breezier and more coherent [than Sounds from Nowheresville], sticking mainly to the kind of insouciant disco-funk-pop that [The Ting Tings] do so well." Sputnikmusic's Raul Stanciu viewed the album as "a short and rather sweet effort that might not launch them to the top of the charts once again, but at least confirms us they're not yet ready to fade into obscurity", while commending The Ting Tings for "creating a consistent record that not only manages to mend the damage done by its faulty predecessor, but also create a coherent, fun atmosphere." Virgin Media's Matthew Horton felt that "what Super Critical misses is one really great tune. The closest it comes is 'Green Poison's soulful grind, strangely reminiscent of Stock Aitken & Waterman's 'Roadblock', yet no cigar. Otherwise this is just frothy fun, which is fine—but only fine."

Stephen Dalton of Uncut wrote, "With echoes of prime-time Chic, Prince and Madonna, the intent is admirable even if too many of the songs feel flimsy and pedestrian", but described the songs "Communication" and "Failure" as "unabashedly gorgeous blasts of sugardipped synth-funk hedonism." Despite stating that the album "actually isn't all that bad, and certainly marks an improvement on its disastrous predecessor, Songs from Nowheresville", the Shields Gazette commented that "there's here nothing which leaves any lasting impression." Dorian Lynskey of Q magazine noted that Super Critical "sounds less petulant but no more likely to return [the duo] to the Top 10", adding that it "would be a solid album for someone like Annie, For The Ting Tings, though, it suggests there's no way back from Nowheresville." The Observers Killian Fox opined that the duo "can still write a catchy tune [...] but these songs are all surface, with only the odd hook to snag us." Guy Oddy of The Arts Desk panned the album, dubbing it a "disappointment" and expressing that "it's not wholly clear whether the Ting Tings have become cultural commentators, like Negativland without samplers, and Super Critical is a prank about the vacuousness of so much chart pop, or whether they've committed commercial suicide."

Track listing
All songs written by Katie White, Jules De Martino, and Andy Taylor.

Charts

Release history

References

2014 albums
The Ting Tings albums